The 2008 Mid-American Conference baseball tournament took place in May 2008. The top eight regular season finishers met in the double-elimination tournament held at V.A. Memorial Stadium in Chillicothe, Ohio. This was the twentieth Mid-American Conference postseason tournament to determine a champion, and first to be held at a neutral site. Second seed  won their third tournament championship to earn the conference's automatic bid to the 2008 NCAA Division I baseball tournament.

Seeding and format 
The winner of each division claimed the top two seeds, while the next six finishers based on conference winning percentage only, regardless of division, participated in the tournament. The teams played a two bracket, double-elimination tournament with the winner of each bracket facing off in a single championship game. This was the first year of the eight team tournament.

Results

All-Tournament Team 
The following players were named to the All-Tournament Team.

Most Valuable Player 
Zack Leonard was named Tournament Most Valuable Player. Leonard played for Eastern Michigan.

References 

Tournament
Mid-American Conference Baseball Tournament
Mid-American Conference baseball tournament
Mid-American Conference baseball tournament